A Flash of Green is a 1984 American drama film directed by Victor Nuñez. It was first shown at the Toronto Festival of Festivals and New York Film Festival in 1984, then aired on PBS as an episode of American Playhouse in 1986. It is based on a 1962 novel by John D. MacDonald.

Plot 
A Flash of Green tells the story of small-town corruption and two people brave enough to fight back. When a local reporter starts sympathizing with an eco-group opposing a new development, a local county commissioner attempts to quiet him with a bribe. Going along with it at first, the reporter soon develops a conscience when the commissioner uses a right-wing paramilitary group to keep the eco-group in line.

Cast 
 Ed Harris as Jimmy Wing
 Blair Brown as Kat Hobble
 Richard Jordan as Elmo Bliss
 George Coe as Brian Haas
 Joan Goodfellow as Mitchie
 Herbert A. Childs as Security Guard

References 

1984 films
1984 drama films
American drama films
American independent films
Films about journalists
Films based on American novels
Films set in Florida
Films shot in Florida
Films based on works by John D. MacDonald
Films directed by Victor Nuñez
American Playhouse
1980s English-language films
1980s American films